Bombay Bakery is an old bakery located in Hyderabad, Sindh, Pakistan. It was named after an Indian city, Bombay.

History
Bombay Bakery was founded by Pahlajrai Gangaram Thadani in 1911. Thadani, a Hindu Amil, was from Dadu, Sindh.

In 1948, Pahlajrai Gangaram Thadani died and his son Kishinchand Thadani became the owner. He expanded the business and wrote a number of recipes.

In 1960, his son, Kumar Thadani took over the business. He remained unmarried throughout his life, adopted a son, Salman Shaikh, who was converted to Islam after his death in 2010.

In 2014, a previously secret recipe was made public by a former baker.

See also
 Karachi Bakery, a similar bakery in Hyderabad, India, named after Karachi

References

1911 establishments in British India
Bakeries of Pakistan
Tourist attractions in Hyderabad, Sindh